Group B of the 2000 Fed Cup Americas Zone Group I was one of two pools in the Americas Zone Group I of the 2000 Fed Cup. Five teams competed in a round robin competition, with the top team advancing to the Group I play-off, the winner of which would advance to 2001 World Group Play-offs, and the bottom team being relegated down to 2001 Group II.

Argentina vs. Mexico

Paraguay vs. Cuba

Argentina vs. Paraguay

Colombia vs. Mexico

Colombia vs. Cuba

Mexico vs. Paraguay

Argentina vs. Cuba

Colombia vs. Paraguay

Argentina vs. Colombia

Mexico vs. Cuba

  failed to win any ties in the pool, and thus was relegated to Group II in 2001, where they placed third overall.

See also
Fed Cup structure

References

External links
 Fed Cup website

2000 Fed Cup Americas Zone